Tazehabad-e Tumar (also Romanized as Tāzehābād-e Tūmār) is a village in Qeshlaq-e Jonubi Rural District, Qeshlaq Dasht District, Bileh Savar County, Ardabil Province, Iran. At the 2006 census, its population was 64, in 14 families.

References 

Populated places in Bileh Savar County
Towns and villages in Bileh Savar County